Freaked!: A Gotee Tribute to DC Talk's Jesus Freak is a 2006 tribute album primarily featuring covers of songs from the American Christian rap and rock trio DC Talk's 1995 album Jesus Freak, performed by various artists signed to the Gotee Records label.

Of the original album's 13 tracks, Freaked! omits only one: "Alas, My Love", a hidden track at the end of the original album.

Track listing

Awards 
In 2007, the album was nominated for a Dove Award for Special Event Album of the Year at the 38th GMA Dove Awards.

References

Gotee Records albums
Tribute albums
2006 albums
DC Talk